Gloxiniopsis is a genus of flowering plants belonging to the family Gesneriaceae.

Its native range is Colombia.

Species:
 Gloxiniopsis racemosa (Benth.) Roalson & Boggan

References

Gesnerioideae
Gesneriaceae genera